Hagavik is a village in Bjørnafjorden municipality in Vestland county, Norway.  The village lies immediately to the west of the municipal centre of Osøyro on the shore of the Skeisosen, an arm off the main Bjørnafjorden.  Hagavik's population is about 1,650.  The actual size of the village is no longer tracked and it is considered part of the urban area of Osøyro.  Nore Neset Church is located in the village, as well as the Kysthospitalet, an orthopedic hospital that is part of the Helse Bergen network.

References

Villages in Vestland
Bjørnafjorden